Doriprismatica balut is a species of sea slug, a dorid nudibranch, a shell-less marine gastropod mollusk in the family Chromodorididae.

Distribution 
This species was described from Maricaban Strait, Mabini (Calumpan Peninsula), Batangas Province, Luzon, Philippines, and several other localities in the Philippines.

References

Chromodorididae
Gastropods described in 2018